Laure Coupat (born 3 April 1976) is a French mountain bike orienteering competitor and World Champion. She won an individual gold medal in sprint at the 2002 World MTB Orienteering Championships, and a silver medal in the relay with the French team.

References

External links

French orienteers
Female orienteers
French female cyclists
Mountain bike orienteers
Living people
Place of birth missing (living people)
Competitors at the 2001 World Games
1976 births
21st-century French women